Eusebius Fermendžin (also Fermendzhin, Fermendjin) (21 September 1845 – 25 June 1897) was an Austro-Hungarian high-ranking Roman Catholic cleric, Franciscan friar and academic of Banat Bulgarian origin.

Born in Vinga in the Austrian Empire (today in Romania) to Luka Fermendžin and Agáta Malćin, Fermendžin was educated in his home place and then in Maria Radna and Vienna, he joined the Franciscan order and substituted his secular name Martin with the religious Eusebius. In the Franciscan order, he held several responsible offices, such as Provincial of Budapest, General-Visitor and Definitor of the Provincial of Rome and representative of the Slavic Franciscans in Warsaw (1882).

His main historical works include , published in Zagreb in 1887, Kronikon Bulgarije, History of the Order of Saint Francis, Krashovan Grammar, etc. He was an active correspondent member of the Zagreb Academy of Sciences.

References
 
 Scholar search
Пейковска, П., Неизвестен ръкопис на Еузебиус Ферменджин за Чипровското въстание и за банатските българи. - Архивен преглед, 1989, No. 3, с. 229–234.http://penkapeykovska.blogspot.hu/p/eusebius-fermendzsin_14.html
Pejkovszka, P., Fermendzsin Özséb és a magyar történetírás. - In: A magyar müvelődés és a kereszténység. Budapest-Szeged, 1998, Vol. II., pp. 907–911. http://mek.oszk.hu/06300/06383/pdf/keresztenyseg2_2resz.pdf
 
Пейковска, П., Българо-унгарски научни взаимоотношения (ХІХ-средата на ХХ в.). С., 2005, с. 83–84.

Bulgarian Austro-Hungarians
Banat Bulgarian people
People from Arad County
Bulgarian Franciscans
Bulgarian Roman Catholics
Bulgarian Christian religious leaders
19th-century Bulgarian historians
1845 births
1897 deaths